Humanimal is a 2009 Chilean film by Francesc Morales. The film is a fantasy horror film set on a world where animals have taken over humans.  It depicts the story of how an innocent Turtle becomes corrupt, as he is exposed to sex and violence. The cast includes recognized Chilean actors such as Ramón Llao, Jenny Cavallo and Sebastián Layseca. Because most characters are animals, the film has absolutely no dialog, so it is considered one of the few modern silent films.

Synopsis
The clumsy Turtle is a victim of the smart Fox. When Cat appears, they compete to seduce her. Cat is only interested in the one that incorporates human habits. Turtle realizes he can gain some advantage by feeding a strange creature with animal meat.

Cast
Ramón Llao as Turtle
Jenny Cavallo as Cat
Sebastián Layseca as Fox
Cecilia Levi as	Bunny
Francisco Gormaz as Lion
Felipe Avello as Tiger
Cristobal Tapia-Montt as Young Man
Antonia Cárcamo	as Girl
Jimena Nuñez as Woman
Martín Morales as Sheep-Boy
Marcelo Nuñez as Sheep-Boy 2
Tomás Llagostera as Sheep-Boy 3
Flavio Cárcamo	as Father
Sebastián Badilla as Gym Instructor

External links
 Official Site
 IMDB Site
 Humanimal at Fangoria
 Humanimal at CNN Chile
 Humanimal at Las Últimas Noticias
 Humanimal at La Cuarta
 Humanimal at La Hora
 Humanimal at La Hora

2009 films
2000s supernatural horror films
2009 fantasy films
Films set in Chile
2009 horror films
Chilean silent films
Dark fantasy films
2009 directorial debut films
Chilean horror films